No Limit is a 1931 American pre-Code comedy film directed by Frank Tuttle and starring Clara Bow, Norman Foster, Stuart Erwin, Thelma Todd, Dixie Lee, and Mischa Auer.

Cast
Clara Bow as Helen "Bunny" O'Day
Norman Foster as Douglas Thayer
Stuart Erwin as Ole Olson
Dixie Lee as Dotty 'Dodo' Potter
Harry Green as Maxie Mindil
Thelma Todd as Betty Royce
Kenne Duncan as Curly Andrews
Mischa Auer as Romeo
Maurice Black as Happy
G. Pat Collins as Charlie
William B. Davidson as Wilkie
Frank Hagney as Battling Hannon
Allan Cavan as Board Member (uncredited)
Robert Greig as Doorman (uncredited)
Lee Phelps as Ticket Taker (uncredited)
Syd Saylor as Reporter (uncredited)

External links

1931 films
American musical comedy films
1930s English-language films
1931 musical comedy films
American black-and-white films
Films directed by Frank Tuttle
Films produced by B. P. Schulberg
1930s American films